A belvedere  or belvidere (from Italian for "beautiful view") is an architectural structure sited to take advantage of a fine or scenic view.  The term has been used both for rooms in the upper part of a building or structures on the roof, or a separate pavilion in a garden or park.  The actual structure can be of any form or style, including a turret, a cupola or an open gallery.  The term may be also used for a paved terrace or just a place with a good viewpoint, but no actual building. 

It has also been used as a name for a whole building, as in the Belvedere, Vienna, a huge palace, or Belvedere Castle, a folly in Central Park in New York.

Examples
On the hillside above the Vatican Palace, (circa 1480-1490), Antonio del Pollaiuolo built a small pavilion (casino in Italian) named the palazzetto or the Belvedere for Pope Innocent VIII. Some years later Donato Bramante linked the Vatican with the Belvedere, a commission from Pope Julius II, by creating the Cortile del Belvedere ("Courtyard of the Belvedere"), in which stood the Apollo Belvedere, among the most famous of antique sculptures. This began the fashion in the 16th century for the belvedere.

Gallery

See also

 Belvedere (M. C. Escher), a picture by M. C. Escher which shows an impossible belvedere
 Gazebo
 Gloriette
 Widow's walk

General references

Citations

External links 
 

Architectural elements